Ingolf Mork (4 June 1947 – 1 February 2012) was a Norwegian ski jumper who was born in Molde, and represented IL Hjelset-Fram and SFK Lyn in Oslo. He won the Four Hills Tournament in 1972, and had two victories in the Holmenkollen (1971 and 1972).

In 1973, Mork received the Holmenkollen medal (shared with Einar Bergsland and Franz Keller).

Mork had his education from the Norwegian School of Sport Sciences.  Mork died on 1 February 2012, aged 64.

References

Holmenkollen medalists - click Holmenkollmedaljen for downloadable pdf file 
Holmenkollen winners since 1892 - click Vinnere for downloadable pdf file 

1947 births
2012 deaths
People from Molde
Ski jumpers at the 1972 Winter Olympics
Holmenkollen medalists
Holmenkollen Ski Festival winners
Norwegian male ski jumpers
Olympic ski jumpers of Norway
Norwegian School of Sport Sciences alumni
Sportspeople from Møre og Romsdal